Hrvoje Ćustić (21 October 1983 – 3 April 2008) was a Croatian footballer who played as a midfielder.

Career 
Ćustić started his professional career with his youth club NK Zadar in 2000 and also spent two seasons playing for NK Zagreb between 2005 and 2007, before returning to Zadar in the summer of 2007 on a four-year contract.

International 
Between 2004 and 2005, he also played for the Croatian national under-21 team, winning a total of 7 international caps for the team.

Death

In the opening minutes of his club's home match against HNK Cibalia in the Croatian first division on 29 March 2008, Ćustić suffered severe head injuries after colliding with a concrete wall positioned about three metres from the sideline, supporting the fence which separates the pitch from the stands. Seconds before, Ćustić tried to win a loose ball in a duel with an opposing player, but then both players collided and Ćustić was carried into the wall, hitting it with his head.

He was immediately transported to the local hospital and underwent surgery the following evening. Following the surgery, he was in an induced coma and his condition remained stable until 2 April 2008, when a believed infection caused a rapid increase in his body temperature. His condition immediately worsened and in the early afternoon of 3 April 2008, the hospital confirmed that he was brain dead at 11:51 CET that day. Following his death, all of the Croatian league fixtures scheduled for the following weekend were postponed.

Legacy
Ćustić's NK Zadar teammate and former AS Monaco goalkeeper Danijel Subašić  wears the image of Hrvoje under his jersey while playing.

References

External links

1983 births
2008 deaths
Croatian footballers
NK Zagreb players
NK Zadar players
Association football players who died while playing
Sport deaths in Croatia
Sportspeople from Zadar
Croatia youth international footballers
Croatia under-21 international footballers
Association football forwards
Association football midfielders
Deaths from head injury